The Harvard Center for Population and Development Studies (HCPDS) is an interdisciplinary center at Harvard University, affiliated with the Harvard T.H. Chan School of Public Health.

The Center houses several post-doctoral programs, including the David E. Bell Fellowship, Sloan Fellowship on Aging and Work, and previously the Robert Wood Johnson Foundation Health & Society Scholars program.

History 

The Harvard Center for Population and Development Studies was founded in 1964 by the Harvard School of Public Health (now the Harvard T.H. Chan School of Public Health) under the direction of Dean Jack Snyder and director Roger Revelle with a mandate to address issues of population control. Over the years, the Center’s intellectual concerns have evolved, in broad strokes by decades, to address the following themes:

1960s: Population growth, water resources, reproductive biology
1970s: Population and resources; migration
1980s: Health transitions in developing countries
1990s: Reproductive health, common security, and the global burden of disease
Early 2000s: Well-being of the global poor; health in Africa
2008- : Social and environmental determinants of population health; immigration; aging societies; and health effects of workplace policies, especially as they pertain to women

50th anniversary and symposium 
As a celebration of its 50th anniversary, the Center for Population and Development Studies honored several individuals who played important roles in the development of the Center, including:
Lincoln Chen, MD, MPH, former director of the Center for Population and Development Studies from 1988-1996 and Taro Takemi Professor of International Health at the Harvard School of Public Health.  He was honored for his work as former Director of the Center, which included engaging the Center more directly in international policy research, as well as his work in the publication of several landmark global population books.
Mary Paci, daughter of former HCPDS Director Roger Revelle and member of the Center for Population and Development Studies's advisory committee.  She was honored for her work as a long-term member of the advisory committee of the Center and continued support of funding initiatives at the Harvard School of Public Health.
Sissela Bok, philosopher, ethicist, writer, and former Senior Visiting Fellow at the Center for Population and Development Studies.  She was honored for her work at the Center, including research that contributed to the field of ethics and population study, as well as the convening of a number of workshops and seminar series.

In addition, the Center hosted a 50th anniversary symposium entitled "Reimagining Societies in the Face of Demographic Change," which concerned recent demographic challenges faced by communities in the 21st century, including a rapidly aging global population, women's health and declining fertility, and initiatives the Center for Population and Development Studies is pursuing to help address these challenges.  Some of the keynote speakers at the symposium included:
Julio Frenk, MD, PhD: Former Dean of Faculty at the Harvard T.H. Chan School of Public Health and T & G Angelopoulos Professor of Public Health and International Development, Harvard T.H. Chan School of Public Health and Harvard Kennedy School
Lisa Berkman, PhD: Director, Harvard Center for Population and Development Studies; Thomas D. Cabot Professor of Public Policy, Epidemiology, and Global Health and Population,
Harvard School of Public Health
Babatunde Osotimehin, MD: Executive Director, United Nations Population Fund (UNFPA); Under-Secretary-General of the United Nations
Jack Rowe, MD: Professor of Health Policy and Management, Columbia University Mailman School of Public Health; chair, MacArthur Foundation Research Network on An Aging Society
Michael Marmot, MBBS, MPH, PhD, FRCP, FFPHM, FMedSci: Director, Institute of Health Equity, University College London

Leadership

Current director 

Social epidemiologist Lisa Berkman was appointed director of the Harvard Center for Population and Development Studies by Harvard Provost Steven E. Hyman in October 2007. Berkman is the Thomas D. Cabot Professor of Public Policy, Epidemiology, and Global Health and Population at the Harvard T.H. Chan School of Public Health (formerly the Harvard School of Public Health). She was chair of the School’s Department of Society, Human Development and Health from 1995 – 2008. Recognized for her groundbreaking work in the field of social epidemiology, she is noted for identifying the effects of social networks on mortality risks that helped define the field in the late 1970s. Berkman also broadened the field with her investigations of how social conditions related to inequality, race, ethnicity, and social isolation influence health and aging.

Before coming to the Harvard Chan School in 1995 to head what was formerly the Department of Health and Social Behavior, Berkman was head of the department of chronic disease epidemiology at Yale School of Medicine.

A graduate of Northwestern University, Berkman received her master’s and doctorate in epidemiology from the University of California, Berkeley. She joined the Yale faculty in 1979 as an assistant professor.

She is currently president of the Association of Population Centers, a member of the Institute of Medicine, and serves as chair of the Board of Scientific Counselors of the National Institute on Aging of the National Institutes of Health. She is a past president of the Society for Epidemiologic Research.

Previous directors

Current work 
Over the past 50 years, the Harvard Center for Population and Development Studies has shifted in its concerns about overpopulation and has expanded its focus to examine relevant questions involving demographic shifts, resources, health, and the environment. The Center continues to rely strongly on a robust cadre of multi-disciplinary faculty to advance the field of population science. Although it covers an array of topics, the Center addresses some of the world’s leading population and demographic challenges by focusing on the following five research focal areas

 Social & Environmental Determinants of Population Health
 Aging Societies
 Population Mobility: Migration in a Global Economy
 Lifecourse Perspective
 Work, Health, and Well-being

Major projects
Current major projects of the Center include:
Adversity and Resilience after Hurricane Katrina: This longitudinal study analyzes social demographic markers of low-income parents who lived in New Orleans during Hurricane Katrina.

Health and Aging in Africa: A Longitudinal Study of an INDEPTH Community in South Africa (HAALSI): This study follows and tests a cohort of Agincourt residents for HIV infection and cardiometabolic disease risk factors, then integrates that data with mortality data to study the drivers and consequences of HIV and non-communicable diseases in an aging population in Agincourt, South Africa.
The Program on the Global Demography of Aging (PGDA): Housed at the HCPDS, the Program on the Global Demography of Aging (PGDA) is funded by a NIH grant, and provides support for research on demographic and aging throughout the world with a particular focus on developing countries.

Postdoctoral fellowships 
David E. Bell Fellowship: Named in honor of the late David E. Bell, former Harvard School of Public Health professor and former director of the Harvard Center for Population and Development Studies. the Bell Fellowship Program provides opportunities for research and leadership training in a flexible, 1 or 2 year, non-degree program for researchers and practitioners in the field of population and development.  Bell Fellows examine a broad range of critical issues in the field of population and development studies from multidisciplinary perspectives.
Sloan Fellowship on Aging and Work: Funded by the Alfred P. Sloan Foundation, this interdisciplinary, postdoctoral fellowship addresses the challenges of aging societies and labor force participation.

References 

Harvard University